Colin Goodwin (born 18 August 1962) is a freelance motoring journalist who has worked for a number of magazines including UK titles Car and Autocar. He is currently best known for his 'Ask Goodwin' column in Autocar, where readers write in with their motoring problems and questions. His latest publication The Racing Driver's Pocket-Book is a nostalgic light-hearted look at motor racing before the arrival of Formula 1 and includes extracts from the diaries and memoirs of pioneering drivers, with a bit of interesting technical data from vintage service manuals.

He has built a reputation over the years for more unusual and adventurous stories, such as taking an amphibious vehicle across the English Channel; the vehicle caught fire halfway across. He also held the Guinness World Record for driving backwards the fastest, reaching 104 mph in a Light Car Company Rocket.

He is a keen motorbike rider, previously racing a Triumph Trident classic bike and has written for UK biking magazine TWO in recent years. He also writes about his classic Porsche 911 in Purely Porsche magazine.

Colin has a wife, Amelia and has one daughter, Rachel and is also a friend of Top Gear presenter and ex-Autocar staff member James May. They both recently gained their Private Pilot Licence (PPL).

Goodwin built a RV-7 in his back garden which he named Dumbo. The aircraft was finished in 2014.

References

British motoring journalists
Living people
1962 births